, is a Japanese economist at Dokkyo University, Saitama, a suburb to Tokyo. He is also a television program editor. As an economist he has been highly publicized, expressing his views in television and radio on an array of subjects, from politics to manga to video games. His ideas have elicited a large number of reactions on the internet and in media.

Biography

Early life
At an age of 9, Morinaga began collecting model cars after his father gave him one. Today he possesses over 20,000 miniature cars.

Career

Otaku
In 2006, Takuro Morinaga estimated the global market for otaku to be between 26 billion and 34 billion dollars.

Tax on the beautiful
Morinaga has proposed increased taxes on men who are beautiful and rich, stating this on Nippon TV, which caused quite an Internet-stir.

His proposal intend to model the tax according to the appearance of the taxpayer. His idea was that if the ugly are tax-advantaged, they will have an easier time being charming and engaging in dating, which would result in more marriages, increasing birth and growth in Japan. His proposal classifies single men into four broad categories: the hunks, the normal, the moderately ugly, and the ugly. These groups would be developed by a beauty assessment board consisting of a jury of five women selected at random.

Takuro Morinaga has long been interested in the issue of single people and has published two books on the topic: Akujo to shinshi no keizaigaku (The economics of the femme fatale and the gentleman, 1996), and Hikon no susume (Incitement for celibacy, 1997).

Works
 Akujo to shinshi no keizaigaku (The economics of the femme fatale and the gentleman, 1996)
 Hikon no susume (Incitement for celibacy, 1997)
 Surviving in an Era of ¥3 Million Annual Income (2003)

References

1957 births
Living people
Japanese television presenters
20th-century Japanese economists
21st-century Japanese economists
People from Meguro
University of Tokyo alumni